(The) Lake House may refer to:

 Lake house (real estate), a house located on or near a lake; a cottage or summer house

Places
 Lake House (Antarctica), a lake in Victoria Land, Antarctica

Entertainment
 The Lake House (film), a 2006 film – unrelated to the novel of the same title
 The Lake House (Patterson novel), a 2003 novel by James Patterson – unrelated to the film of the same title
 The Lake House (Morton novel), a 2015 novel by Kate Morton – unrelated to the novel and the film of the same name 
 The Lake House (Rhode novel), a 1946 detective novel by John Rhode
 Lakehouse (2013 EP), album by Lebanese band Postcards (band)
 The Lakehouse (2006 song), song by Rachel Portman, from the 2006 film The Lake House, on the soundtrack album The Lake House: Original Motion Picture Soundtrack
 "The Lake House" (Brooklyn Nine-Nine), an episode of the eighth season of Brooklyn Nine-Nine

Facilities and structures
 The Lake House (Waterford, Maine), a historic tavern
 Lake House, an Elizabethan country house in Wiltshire, England
 Lake House, a building in the Olds-Robb Recreation-Intramural Complex, Eastern Michigan University's recreation center
 Lake House, recreational park at Angelo State University, Texas
 Lakehouse, a residential highrise in Denver, Colorado, USA; see List of tallest buildings in Denver

Companies
 Lake House, now known as Associated Newspapers of Ceylon Limited, located in Sri Lanka
 Lakehouse plc, a British energy company, renamed Sureserve in October 2018.

See also 
 
 
 Loon Lake House, a hotel at Loon Lake (Franklin County, New York)
 Moon's Lake House, a resort at Saratoga Springs, New York